Kjeld Kjos (31 July 1905 – 2 October 1983) was a Norwegian footballer. He played in 22 matches for the Norway national football team from 1927 to 1936. He was also part of Norway's squad for the football tournament at the 1936 Summer Olympics, but he did not play in any matches.

References

External links
 

1905 births
1983 deaths
Norwegian footballers
Norway international footballers
Footballers from Bergen
Association football midfielders
SK Brann players